"The Goodies – Almost Live" is an episode of the British comedy television series The Goodies.

This episode, which takes the form of a pop concert, is also known as "The Goodies in Concert".

The Goodies also appear as "Pan's Grannies".

Written by The Goodies, with songs and music by Bill Oddie.

Songs
The songs, featured in the show (in chronological order), are:

References

 "The Complete Goodies" — Robert Ross, B T Batsford, London, 2000
 "The Goodies Rule OK" — Robert Ross, Carlton Books Ltd, Sydney, 2006
 "The Goodies Episode Summaries" — Brett Allender
 "The Goodies — Fact File" — Matthew K. Sharp

External links
 

The Goodies (series 6) episodes
1976 British television episodes